Kaori Chiba-Fujio (born January 29, 1981, in Minami-Alps, Yamanashi) is a field hockey player from Japan. She represented her native country at the Summer Olympics (2004, 2008 and 2012
).

Chiba became topscorer at the 2006 Women's Hockey World Cup Qualifier in Rome, Italy, alongside Tomomi Komori (Japan), Rhona Simpson (Scotland) and Maryna Vynohradova (Ukraine), scoring six goals.

References

External links
 
 
 

1981 births
Living people
Japanese female field hockey players
Field hockey players at the 2004 Summer Olympics
Field hockey players at the 2008 Summer Olympics
Field hockey players at the 2012 Summer Olympics
Olympic field hockey players of Japan
Sportspeople from Yamanashi Prefecture
Asian Games medalists in field hockey
Field hockey players at the 2002 Asian Games
Field hockey players at the 2006 Asian Games
Field hockey players at the 2010 Asian Games
Asian Games silver medalists for Japan
Asian Games bronze medalists for Japan
Medalists at the 2002 Asian Games
Medalists at the 2006 Asian Games
Medalists at the 2010 Asian Games